Raziq or Razik may refer to:

People with the given name
Raziq Faani (1947–2007), Afghan poet 
Razik Fareed (1893–1984), Sri Lankan politician, diplomat and philanthropist
Raziq Khan (born 1979), an Emirati international cricketer

People with the surname
Abdul Raziq, one of the Pakistani detainees at Guantanamo Bay
Ali Abdel Raziq (1888–1966), Egyptian scholar of Islam
Ghulam Raziq (born 1932), Pakistani hurdler 
Shahier Razik (born 1977), Egyptian-Canadian squash player

See also

Razak (disambiguation)
Razaq (disambiguation)